Dr. Zemaryalai Tarzi (born 1939) is an archaeologist from Afghanistan.

Born in Kabul in 1939, Professor Tarzi completed his studies under the supervision of Professor Daniel Schlumberger, in the process of obtaining three Ph.Ds. From 1973 to 1979, he was Director of Archaeology and Preservation of Historical Monuments of Afghanistan as well as the Director General of the Archaeology Institute of Kabul. Tarzi was exiled to France in 1979, where he assumed the post of Professor of Eastern Archaeology at the University of Strasbourg.

He later directed the excavations in Bamiyan and Hadda on the sites of Tape Shotor and Tape Tope Kalan. He is currently Director for the French Archaeological Missions for the Surveys and Excavations of Bamiyan. Dr. Tarzi starred in Christian Frei's documentary The Giant Buddhas about the Taliban's destruction of the Buddhas of Bamyan.

Professor Tarzi is the author of some sixty articles and books, and serves as president of the Association for the Protection of Afghan Archaeology (APAA), based in San Rafael, California.

References

External links
Association for the Protection of Afghan Archaeology, Inc.

Pashtun people
Afghan exiles
Afghan archaeologists
Living people
1939 births